Galliano Rossini (17 May 1927 – 13 November 1987) was an Italian sports shooter. He competed at the 1952, 1956, 1960, 1964 and 1968 Olympics in the trap event and finished in 7th, 1st, 2nd, 4th and 13th place, respectively. He also won six medals in the trap at the world championships of 1954–1959.

References

External links

1927 births
1987 deaths
Italian male sport shooters
Trap and double trap shooters
Shooters at the 1952 Summer Olympics
Shooters at the 1956 Summer Olympics
Shooters at the 1960 Summer Olympics
Shooters at the 1964 Summer Olympics
Shooters at the 1968 Summer Olympics
Olympic shooters of Italy
Olympic gold medalists for Italy
Olympic silver medalists for Italy
Olympic medalists in shooting
Medalists at the 1956 Summer Olympics
Medalists at the 1960 Summer Olympics
20th-century Italian people